The Porcupine is a short novel by Julian Barnes originally published in 1992. Before its British release date the book was first published earlier that year in Bulgarian, with the title Бодливо свинче (Bodlivo Svinche) by Obsidian of Sofia.

Synopsis
Set in a post-communist fictional country, likely based on Bulgaria, the novel concerns the trial of Stoyo Petkanov, a character judged to be loosely based on Todor Zhivkov, the former communist leader of Bulgaria. As the newly appointed Prosecutor General attempts to ensnare the former dictator with his own totalitarian laws, Petkanov springs a few unwelcome surprises on the court by conducting a formidable defense.

The Times described the book as 'Superbly humane in its moral concerns...an excellent novel'.

References

 British Library Catalogue - http://searchbeta.bl.uk/primo_library/libweb/action/search.
 Jonathan Cape Publishers - Julian Barnes, The Porcupine
 Open Library - https://openlibrary.org/works/OL1984725W/The_porcupine

Novels by Julian Barnes
Political novels
1992 British novels
Novels set in Bulgaria
Jonathan Cape books